The Carlow Senior Football Championship (currently also known for sponsorship reasons as the Michael Lyng Motors Carlow SFC), is an annual Gaelic football competition contested by top-tier Carlow GAA clubs. The Carlow County Board of the Gaelic Athletic Association has organised it since 1889.

Palatine are the title holders (2022) defeating Tinryland in the Final.

History
The Carlow Senior Club Football Championship began in 1889 when Ballon O'Gorman-Mahon's defeated Tullow Stars and Stripes by a very low scoreline of 1-01 to 0-00. There was no Carlow senior club football championship between 1891 and 1897. The 1941 championship was abandoned due to an outbreak of foot and mouth disease. Éire Óg are the most successful team, having won the title on 28 occasions.

Honours
The trophy presented to the winners is ? The winning club qualifies to represent the county in the Leinster Senior Club Football Championship, the winners of which progress to the All-Ireland Senior Club Football Championship.

List of finals
(r) = replay

Wins listed by club

References

External links
Official Carlow Website
Carlow on Hoganstand
Carlow Club GAA
Finals results

 
Senior Gaelic football county championships